Una is a feminine given name. Úna is an Irish language version, that may be derived from the Irish word uan 'lamb'. An alternative spelling is Oona. The Scottish Gaelic form is Ùna. The name Una may mean "the personification of truth, beauty, and unity".

People with the name
 Una Abell-Brinker (1874–1952), American actress
 Una Stella Abrahamson (1922–1999), English-born Canadian artist and writer
Una Baines (born 1957), British keyboard player and member of The Fall
 Una Mabel Bourne (1882-1974), Australian pianist and composer
 Una Budd (born 1975), Irish international cricketer
 Una Carter (1890–1954), New Zealand cooking teacher, demonstrator and writer
 Una Chi (1942–2021), Italian translator and writer
 Una S. T. Clarke (born 1934), American politician
 Una Crawford O'Brien (fl. from 1998), Irish actor
 Una Damon (born 1964), South Korean and American actress
 Una Deerbon (1882–1972), Australian studio potter
 Una Ellis-Fermor (1894–1958), English literary critic and author
 Una Lucy Fielding (1888–1969), Australian neuroanatomist
 Una Hale (1922-2005), Australian operatic soprano
 Una Hanbury (1904–1990), American sculptor
 Una Harkin (born 1983), Irish Gaelic and association football player
 Una Healy (born 1981), Irish singer-songwriter and member of the girlgroup The Saturdays
 Una B. Herrick (1863–1950), American educator
 Una Hunt (1876–1957), American author
 Una Jagose (fl. from 1990), New Zealand lawyer
 Una Leacy (born 1988), Irish camogie player
 Una McCormack (born 1972), British-Irish academic, scriptwriter and novelist
 Una McLean (born 1930), Scottish actress and comedian
 Úna MacLochlainn (born 1987), Irish singer-songwriter
 Una Marson (1905–1965), Jamaican feminist
 Una Merkel (1903–1986), American actress
 Una Morris (born 1947), Jamaican sprinter, physician and restaurateur
 Una Mullally (born 1983), Irish journalist and broadcaster
 Una O'Brien, British senior civil servant 2010–2016
 Una O'Connor (actress) (1880–1959), Irish actress
 Úna O'Connor (camogie) (1938–2020), Irish camogie player
 Una O'Keefe (born 1954), widow of Harry Nilsson
 Una O'Donoghue (born 1981), Irish camogie player
 Una O'Dwyer (camogie), Irish camogie player
 Una O'Hagan (born 1962), Irish author and journalist 
 Una Paisley (1922–1977), Australian cricket player
 Úna Palliser (fl. from 2002), Irish-born musician
 Una Platts (1908-2005), New Zealand artist and art historian
 Una Pope-Hennessy (1875-1949), British historian
 Una Power, English-born Irish card reader and author
 Una Raymond-Hoey (born 1996), Irish cricketer
 Una Ross, 25th Baroness de Ros (1879–1956), British peer
 Una Ryan (born 1941), British-American biologist
 Una M. Ryan (born 1966), Irish biochemist
 Una Stubbs (1937–2021), English actress
 Una Troy (1910-1993), Irish novelist
 Una Vincenzo, Lady Troubridge (1887-1963), British sculptor and translator
 Una Watters (1918-1965), Irish artist and librarian
 Una White (died 1997), Jamaican-British nurse

Fictional characters with the name
 Una, a character in The Faerie Queene by Edmund Spenser
 Una, one codename of the DC Comics superheroine Luornu Durgo
 Una (Stardust), a character in Stardust by Neil Gaiman
 Una, the name of Number One in Star Trek

See also

 List of Irish-language given names
 Una (disambiguation)
 Saint Hunna (died 679)

References

External links
 http://medievalscotland.org/kmo/AnnalsIndex/Feminine/Una.shtml

Irish-language feminine given names